Clavatoma pulchra is an extinct species of sea snail, a marine gastropod mollusk in the family Pseudomelatomidae, the turrids and allies

Description
The length of the shell attains 25 mm.

Distribution
This extinct species is endemic to New Zealand and was found in Pliocene strata of Opoitian and Waipipian rocks of northern Wairarapa

References

 Powell, Arthur William Baden. "The New Zealand recent and fossil Mollusca of the family Turridae with general notes on Turrid nomenclature and systematics." (1942); Bulletin of the Auckland Institute and Museum 2: 192 pp.
 Maxwell, P.A. (2009). Cenozoic Mollusca. pp. 232–254 in Gordon, D.P. (ed.) New Zealand inventory of biodiversity. Volume one. Kingdom Animalia: Radiata, Lophotrochozoa, Deuterostomia. Canterbury University Press, Christchurch
 Aidan Gordon Milner (2017), The Pliocene-Pleistocene development, uplift and emergence history of the Manawatu Strait, New Zealand; thesis submitted to the Victoria University of Wellington

External links
 A.G. Beu (1973), Descriptions of new species and notes on taxonomy of New Zealand Mollusca, No.2; Journal of the Royal Society of New Zealand  3:3, 307-332
 A.G. Beu and J.I. Raine (2009). Revised descriptions of New Zealand Cenozoic Mollusca from Beu and Maxwell (1990). GNS Science miscellaneous series no. 27

pulchra
Gastropods described in 1942
Gastropods of New Zealand
Pliocene gastropods